Bhikkhu Bodhi (born December 10, 1944), born Jeffrey Block, is an American Theravada Buddhist monk, ordained in Sri Lanka and currently teaching in the New York and New Jersey area. He was appointed the second president of the Buddhist Publication Society and has edited and authored several publications grounded in the Theravada Buddhist tradition.

Life
In 1944, Block was born in Brooklyn, New York, to Jewish parents. He grew up in Borough Park, where he attended elementary school P.S. 160. In 1966, he obtained a B.A. in philosophy from Brooklyn College. In 1972, he obtained a PhD in philosophy from Claremont Graduate University.

In 1967, while still a graduate student, Bodhi was ordained as a sāmaṇera (novice) in the Vietnamese Mahayana order. In 1972, after graduation, Bodhi traveled to Sri Lanka where, under Balangoda Ananda Maitreya Thero, he received sāmaṇera ordination in the Theravada Order and, in 1973, he received full ordination (upasampadā) as a Theravāda bhikkhu or monk.

In 1984, succeeding co-founder Nyanaponika Thera,  Bodhi was appointed English-language editor of the Buddhist Publication Society (BPS, Sri Lanka) and, in 1988, became its president.  In 2002, he retired from the society's editorship while still remaining its president.

In 2000, at the United Nations' first official Vesak celebration, Bodhi gave the keynote address.

In 2002, after retiring as editor of BPS, Bodhi returned to the United States. After living at Bodhi Monastery (Lafayette Township, New Jersey), he now lives and teaches at Chuang Yen Monastery (Carmel, New York), and is the president of the Buddhist Association of the United States.

Bhikkhu Bodhi is founder of the organization Buddhist Global Relief, which funds projects to fight hunger and to empower women across the world.

Works

Bodhi, Bhikkhu (2009). The Revival of Bhikkhuni Ordination in the Theravada Tradition. Inward Path.  ISBN 978-983-3512-63-8

Wheel Publications (BPS)
Nourishing the Roots and Other Essays on Buddhist Ethics (WH259/260)
Transcendental Dependent Arising (WH277/278)
Going for Refuge; Taking the Precepts (WH282/284)
Dana: The Practice of Giving (WH367/369)
Maha Kaccana: Master of Doctrinal Exposition (WH405/406)
Facing the Future: Four essays on the social relevance of Buddhism (WH438/440)

Bodhi Leaf Publications (BPS)
Taste of Freedom (BL71)
The Living Message of the Dhammapada (BL129)
Discourses of the Ancient Nuns (BL143)
The Good, the Beautiful, and the True (BL154)

See also
 Buddhist Global Relief
 Buddhist Publication Society
 Chuang Yen Monastery
 List of peace activists

References

External links
Profile at Bodhi Monastery
Plemeniti Osmostruki Put, 2011 (Serbian)

1944 births
Living people
Converts to Buddhism from Judaism
Buddhist translators
Pali–English translators
Theravada Buddhism writers
American writers
Theravada Buddhist monks
American Theravada Buddhists
American Buddhist monks
American Buddhists
American scholars of Buddhism
Brooklyn College alumni
Claremont Graduate University alumni
Writers from Brooklyn
People from Lafayette Township, New Jersey
People from Borough Park, Brooklyn
21st-century American Buddhists